The 2005 Alabama State Hornets football team represented Alabama State University as a member of the East Division of the Southwestern Athletic Conference (SWAC) during the 2005 NCAA Division I-AA football season. Led by third-year head coach Charles Coe, the Hornets compiled an overall record of 6–5 with a mark of 6–3 in conference play, placing second in the SWAC's East Division. Alabama State played home games at Cramton Bowl in Montgomery, Alabama.

Schedule

References

Alabama State
Alabama State Hornets football seasons
Alabama State Hornets football